Statistics of Futisliiga in the 1991 season.

Overview
It was contested by 12 teams, and Kuusysi Lahti won the championship.

League standings

Results

Matches 1–22

Matches 23–33

See also
Ykkönen (Tier 2)

References
Finland - List of final tables (RSSSF)

Veikkausliiga seasons
Fin
Fin
1